All at Sea is a 1935 British comedy film directed by Anthony Kimmins and starring Googie Withers, Tyrell Davis and Rex Harrison. Its plot follows a young man who falls in love during a cruise, and takes up a false identity as a famous writer to impress her.

Made as a quota quickie by Fox Film at Wembley Studios, it is an adaptation of the 1931 play Mr Faint-Heart by Ian Hay.

Premise
When mild mannered Joe (Tyrell Davis) comes into an inheritance, he leaves his job as a clerk, and embarks on a sea cruise. Posing as a successful writer, Joe attracts various attractive women to him on the voyage, but his deceptions start to land him in trouble.

Cast
Tyrell Davis as Joe Finch
Googie Withers as Daphne Tomkins
James Carew as Julius Mablethorpe
Cecily Byrne as Mary Maggs
Rex Harrison as Aubrey Bellingham
Dorothy Vernon as Mrs. Humphrey
James Harcourt as Mr. Humphrey
Colin Lesslie as Tony Lambert

Critical reception
TV Guide called it a "Tepid programmer."

References

External links

1935 films
British comedy films
1935 comedy films
Films directed by Anthony Kimmins
Films based on works by Ian Hay
Quota quickies
Seafaring films
Films shot at Wembley Studios
Fox Film films
British black-and-white films
1936 comedy films
1936 films
1930s English-language films
1930s American films
1930s British films